The Department of Premier and Cabinet (DPC) is a government department in Victoria, Australia. The department is located at 1 Treasury Place, Melbourne, Victoria, with branch offices in Ballarat and Bendigo.

Similar to other executive offices such as the federal Department of the Prime Minister and Cabinet or the British Cabinet Office, the DPC provides support to the Premier and the public service, and is responsible for a number of miscellaneous matters not handled by other departments.

Ministers
, the DPC supports four ministers in the following portfolios:

Functions
The DPC has responsibility over the following policy areas:
 Government administration
 Public service
 Aboriginal affairs
 Equalities
 Government communication
 Liaison with Governor
 Veterans' affairs
 Youth affairs
 Electoral affairs
 Government integrity and anti-corruption
 Multicultural affairs

Agencies
Agencies under the DPC's portfolios include:

See also 

List of Victorian government agencies
Premiers of the Australian states

Notes

References

Premier